Immigration into Ukraine post independence has been mainly ethnic Ukrainians already living in nearby countries (for example in 1993 they were 90% of all immigrants); other immigrants were mostly Crimean Tatars and people fleeing wars in Azerbaijan, Transnistria and Ichkeria (now part of Russia as the Chechen Republic). In January 2017 there were 3,302 foreigners with refugee status in Ukraine. Most refugees came from Afghanistan, Syria, Armenia, Azerbaijan, Russia and Somalia.

After the start of the War in Donbas in 2014 several hundred foreigners (mostly Russians and Belarusians) migrated to Ukraine to join its territorial defence battalions and army.

Countries of origin

References

External links

Governmental
Immigration to Ukraine, Ministry of Foreign Affairs of Ukraine

 
Foreign relations of Ukraine